Seyyed Mehdi Abtahi (born 2 March 1963) is an Iranian professional futsal coach and former footballer.

Career
Abtahi made 38 appearances for the Iran national football team from 1985 to 1993.

Honors

Iran 
AFC Asian Cup
 1988, Third Place
 1992, Group Stage
Asian Games
1986 Asian Games Quarter Final
1990 Asian Games Champions

Esteghlal FC 
Asian Club Championship
1990–91 Champions
1992 Runner-up

Bahman FC 
Azadegan League
1995–96 Runner-up

References

External links

1963 births
Living people
Sportspeople from Tehran
Iranian footballers
Iranian men's futsal players
Iranian futsal coaches
Iran international footballers
Persepolis F.C. players
Esteghlal F.C. players
Keshavarz players
Bahman players
1992 AFC Asian Cup players
Shahid Mansouri FSC managers
Giti Pasand FSC managers
Asian Games medalists in football
Footballers at the 1986 Asian Games
Footballers at the 1990 Asian Games
Asian Games gold medalists for Iran
Association football midfielders
Medalists at the 1990 Asian Games